Laxmipur is a small town in Maharajganj district of Uttar Pradesh. It is located in eastern Uttar Pradesh. It is known for its first forest tramway of Asia or the Sohagi Barwa Sanctuary.

Villages in Maharajganj district